Ferdinand Q. Morton (1881 – 1949) was an American political leader during the Harlem Renaissance in Harlem, New York City.

Biography 
Ferdinand Q. Morton's parents, Edward James Morton and Mattie Shelton Morton, were former slaves in Mississippi.

Morton attended Harvard University, though he remained half-a-credit shy of graduating due to a policy change.  He attended Boston University School of Law for a year and a half.  Morton began his career in politics by working on the unsuccessful presidential campaign of Democrat William Jennings Bryant.  He passed the New York State Bar in 1910.

Morton joined the United Colored Democracy (UCD), a New York City African-American organization that allied with the New York City Democratic Party organization known as Tammany Hall. Morton became the leader of the UCD in 1915.  In 1922, Morton was appointed to the New York City Civil Service Commission as its first African-American member; he served for 26 years.  Morton used his influence to secure the appointment of several African-American judges during his career.

See also 
J. Raymond Jones

References 

Politicians from New York City
African-American history in New York City
20th-century American politicians
African-American people in New York (state) politics
New York (state) Democrats
1881 births
1949 deaths
20th-century African-American politicians